William Law (August 5, 1833 – November 21, 1901) was a merchant and political figure in Nova Scotia, Canada. He represented Yarmouth County in the Nova Scotia House of Assembly from 1886 to  1900 as a Liberal member.

He was born in Belfast, Ireland and came to Yarmouth, Nova Scotia in October 1847. Two years later, Law moved to Oxford, Massachusetts; he returned to Yarmouth in 1855. In 1854, he married Mary A. Brown. His firm, William Law and Company was involved in shipping and insurance. Law also served as a justice of the peace. He married Annie T. Gilman in 1900 after the death of his first wife. He was named to the province's Legislative Council in 1901 and served until his death later that year in Yarmouth.

References 
The Canadian parliamentary companion, 1897 JA Gemmill
 A Directory of the Members of the Legislative Assembly of Nova Scotia, 1758-1958, Public Archives of Nova Scotia (1958)

1833 births
1901 deaths
Nova Scotia Liberal Party MLAs
Nova Scotia Liberal Party MLCs